Richard H. Wilson (born 8 May 1956) was a New Zealand association football player, who was a goalkeeper during the country's first successful campaign to qualify for the FIFA World Cup, in 1982. His international career spanned from 1979 to 1984, and he played in the National Soccer League in Australia until 1989. He returned to New Zealand in 1996 and was player-coach of minor-league side Avon United. 

Despite being the only goalkeeper used during the 1982 World Cup qualifying campaign, he was replaced as starting goalkeeper for the finals tournament in Spain by Frank van Hattum. For a considerable time, Wilson held the record for most minutes without conceding a goal by a goalkeeper in any FIFA World Cup qualifying or finals tournament, having not conceded a goal in 921 minutes of football, including matches against Fiji (twice), Chinese Taipei (twice), Indonesia (twice), China (twice) and Australia (once).

His record clean sheet came to a dramatic end during a World Cup home qualifying fixture against Kuwait. Kuwait were controversially awarded a penalty by the Indonesian referee. Wilson spectacularly saved the spot kick only to have a further penalty awarded against New Zealand 10 minutes later. The second penalty found the back of the net bringing to an end Wilson's record. The taking of the second penalty was delayed for some minutes after an irate fan ran onto the field to remonstrate with the referee.

References

External links

New Zealand 1982 World Cup squad

1956 births
Living people
Association football goalkeepers
New Zealand association footballers
New Zealand expatriate association footballers
New Zealand international footballers
Canberra City FC players
Preston Lions FC players
Kettering Town F.C. players
Lincoln City F.C. players
Expatriate soccer players in Australia
Expatriate footballers in England
New Zealand expatriate sportspeople in Australia
New Zealand expatriate sportspeople in England
1980 Oceania Cup players
1982 FIFA World Cup players